Dactyloscopus lacteus, the also known as the milky sand stargazer, is a species of sand stargazer endemic to the Galapagos Islands where it is the only species of Dactyloscopus known to occur there, and is a common fish in its region. It can grow to reach a maximum length of  SL.

References

lacteus
Taxa named by George S. Myers
Taxa named by Charles Barkley Wade
Fish described in 1946
Endemic fauna of the Galápagos Islands